Koji Suzuki (鈴木 孝司, born July 25, 1989) is a Japanese football player who plays for Albirex Niigata.

Club statistics
Updated to 7 March 2019.

References

External links
Profile at Machida Zelvia

1989 births
Living people
Hosei University alumni
Association football people from Kanagawa Prefecture
Japanese footballers
J1 League players
J2 League players
J3 League players
Japan Football League players
FC Machida Zelvia players
FC Ryukyu players
Cerezo Osaka players
Association football forwards